Ragiwara is a residential neighbourhood in Lyari, located in the Karachi South district of Karachi, Pakistan.

There are several ethnic groups in Rangiwara including Sindhis, Punjabis, Kashmiris, Pakhtuns, Baloch, Makrani People (Majority of Punjguri) Makrani), Hazarewal, Dawoodi Bohras. Over 97% of the population is Muslim and 3% Hindu community. The population of Lyari Town is estimated to be over 600,000  in 2005.

References

External links 
 Karachi website - Archived

Neighbourhoods of Karachi
Lyari Town